The Juan Fernández Islands are a sparsely inhabited series of islands in the South Pacific Ocean reliant on tourism and fishing. The group is part of Insular Chile.

The islands are primarily known for having been the home to the marooned sailor Alexander Selkirk for more than four years from 1704, which may have inspired Daniel Defoe's Robinson Crusoe. Most of the archipelago's present-day inhabitants reside on Robinson Crusoe Island, and mainly in the capital, San Juan Bautista, located at Cumberland Bay on the island's north coast.

The group of islands is part of Chile's Valparaíso Region (which also includes Easter Island) and, along with the Desventuradas Islands, forms one of the nine communes of Valparaíso Province. The islands are named after Juan Fernández, the explorer who discovered them in the 1570s.

Geography

 Robinson Crusoe Island, also known as Isla Más a Tierra, is located closest to the mainland of continental South America, and is surrounded by a number of islets, including Juanango, Viñilla, Los Chamelos, Los Claveles and El Verdugo.
 Alejandro Selkirk Island, also known as Isla Más Afuera, is located  further west.

The island's population was 57 in 2012. The population of Robinson Crusoe was 843 in 2012. Santa Clara is uninhabited.

The islands are volcanic in origin, produced by the movement of the Nazca Plate over the Juan Fernández hotspot. As the plate moved eastward over the hot spot, volcanic eruptions formed the Juan Fernández Ridge before being subducted under the South American continent at the Peru–Chile Trench. The islands occur where the peaks of the submarine ridge have protruded above sea level. Radiometric dating indicates that Santa Clara is the oldest of the islands, at 5.8 million years old, followed by Robinson Crusoe, 3.8 – 4.2 million years old, and Alexander Selkirk, 1.0 – 2.4 million years old.

The seafloor around Juan Fernández Islands is rich in Manganese–Iron nodules, which might be of potential economic interest.

Some consider the islands to be one of the easternmost points of Oceania, rather than an outlying region of South America. In their book Shore Fishes of Easter Island, authors John E. Randall and Alfredo Cea Egana claim that the Juan Fernández Islands have "great similarity in ichthyofauna with Oceania more so than with the nearing South America."

Climate
The islands have a subtropical Mediterranean climate, moderated by the cold Humboldt Current, which flows northward to the east of the islands, and the southeast trade winds. Higher elevations are generally cooler, with occasional frosts on Robinson Crusoe.

Much of the variability in rainfall depends on the El Niño-Southern Oscillation. Rainfall is higher in the winter months, and varies with elevation and exposure; elevations above  experience almost daily rainfall, while the western, leeward side of Robinson Crusoe and Santa Clara are quite dry.

Biota and ecology

The Juan Fernández islands are home to a high percentage of rare and endemic plants and animals, and are recognized as a distinct ecoregion. The volcanic origin and remote location of the islands meant that the islands' flora and fauna had to reach the archipelago from far across the sea; as a result, the island is home to relatively few plant species and very few animal species. The closest relatives of the archipelago's plants and animals are found in the Temperate broadleaf and mixed forests ecoregions of southern South America, including the Valdivian temperate rain forests, Magellanic subpolar forests, and Desventuradas Islands.

Flora
There are 209 native species of vascular plants in the Juan Fernandez Islands, approximately 150 of which are flowering plants, and 50 are ferns. There are 126 species (62 percent) that are endemic, with 12 endemic genera and two endemic families, Lactoridaceae and Thyrsopteridaceae. Many plants are characteristic of the Antarctic flora, and are related to plants found in southern South America, New Zealand and Australia. Vegetation zones generally correspond to elevation, with grasslands and shrublands at lower elevations, tall and montane forests at middle elevations, and shrublands at the highest elevations. The two main islands have somewhat distinct plant communities.

Santa Clara is covered with grassland.

Three endemic species dominate the tall and lower montane forests of the archipelago, Drimys confertifolia on both main islands, Myrceugenia fernandeziana on Robinson Crusoe, and M. schulzei on Alexander Selkirk. Endemic tree fern species of southern hemisphere genus Dicksonia (D. berteroana on Robinson Crusoe and D. externa on Alexander Selkirk) and the endemic genus Thyrsopteris (T. elegans) are the predominant species in the tree-fern forests. An endemic species of sandalwood, Santalum fernandezianum, was overexploited for its fragrant wood, has not been seen since 1908, and is believed extinct. The Chonta palm (Juania australis), which is endemic to the Juan Fernández Islands, is endangered.

Fauna
The Juan Fernández Islands have a very limited fauna, with no native land mammals, reptiles, or amphibians. Seventeen land and sea-bird species breed on the islands. The island has three endemic bird species, and three endemic subspecies. Introduced fauna by humans include rats and goats. Robinson Crusoe Island is home to an endemic and endangered hummingbird, the Juan Fernández firecrown (Sephanoides fernandensis). The other endemic bird species are the Juan Fernández tit-tyrant (Anairetes fernandezianus) of Robinson Crusoe Island, and the Masafuera rayadito (Aphrastura masafuerae) of Alejandro Selkirk Island. The islands support the entire known breeding populations of two petrel species, Stejneger's Petrel Pterodroma longirostris (IUCN status VU) and the Juan Fernandez Petrel Pterodroma externa (IUCN status VU). In addition, the Juan Fernandez Islands may still support a third breeding petrel species, De Filippi's Petrel Pterodroma defilippiana (IUCN status VU), whose only other known breeding grounds are on the Desventuradas Islands. The Magellanic penguin breeds on Robinson Crusoe Island within the archipelago. All three islands of the Juan Fernandez archipelago have been recognised as Important Bird Areas (IBAs) by BirdLife International.

The endemic Juan-Fernandez spiny lobster (without claws) lives in the marine waters (Jasus frontalis). The Juan Fernández fur seal (Arctophoca philippii) also lives on the islands. This species was nearly exterminated in the sixteenth to nineteenth century, but it was rediscovered in 1965. A census in 1970 found about 750 fur seals living there. The actual population of the Desventuradas may be higher, because the species tends to hide in sea caves. There seems to be a yearly population increase of 16–17 percent.

History

Prehistory
A 2008 report by archaeologists from the Australian National University states that, "a combination of palaeoecology and archaeology in the Juan Fernández Islands showed it was unlikely there had been human activity in the islands before Europeans arrived." Ichthyologists Ingo Hahn and Uwe Römer wrote in 2002, "the geographically isolated Juan Fernández Islands were probably untouched by man until their discovery by European sailors in 1574. Polynesians did not reach further east than Easter Island and native Americans perhaps not west of the South American continent."

Discovery

The archipelago was discovered on 22 November 1574, by the Spanish sailor Juan Fernández, who was sailing south between Callao and Valparaíso along a route which he also discovered, hundreds of miles west of the coast of Chile, which avoided the northerly Humboldt current. He called the islands Más Afuera, Más a Tierra, and Santa Clara.

In the 17th and 18th centuries, the islands were used as a hideout for pirates and became the location of a penal colony. It was during this period that Alexander Selkirk became marooned on the islands. In the 1740s, they were visited by Commodore Anson's flotilla during his ill-fated venture to the South Seas. The location of the archipelago was fixed by Alessandro Malaspina in 1790; previous charts had differed on the location. British and American whaling vessels were regular visitors to the islands, starting with the London (Captain Joshua Coffin) in 1795.

During the maritime fur trade era of the early 19th century the islands were a source of fur seal skins, and the Juan Fernández fur seal was nearly driven to extinction. In his book Two Years Before the Mast (Chapter VII), Richard Henry Dana, Jr. described the islands as he found them circa 1834. At this time the main island was being used as a penal colony. However, when Dr John Coulter visited it in the early 1840s, he reported the island deserted after the approximately 1000 convicts had risen up, killing the soldiers and Governor who had held them captive. The prisoners fled to mainland Chile, where "great numbers" were later hunted down and shot. The story appears in Coulter's book Adventures in the Pacific (1845). In 1908, the islands were visited by the Swedish Magellanic Expedition and Carl Skottsberg is believed to have been the last to have seen the Santalum fernandezianum tree alive.

Late in 1914 the islands were the rendezvous for Admiral Maximilian von Spee's East Asiatic Squadron as he gathered his ships together before defeating the British under Admiral Christopher Cradock at the Battle of Coronel. Following the Royal Navy's win at the Battle of the Falkland Islands a month later, the only surviving German cruiser, was hunted down and cornered illegally at Más a Tierra early in 1915, although she was in Chilean territorial waters, where it was scuttled after a brief battle with British cruisers.

In 1966 the Chilean government renamed Más Afuera as Alejandro Selkirk Island and Más a Tierra as Robinson Crusoe Island, in order to promote tourism. Incidentally, Selkirk never set foot on Más Afuera, only on Más a Tierra. On 30 July 2007, a constitutional reform gave the Juan Fernández Islands and Easter Island the status of "special territories" of Chile. Pending the enactment of a charter the archipelago will continue to be governed as a commune of the Valparaíso Region.

On 27 February 2010, a tsunami following the 8.8 magnitude earthquake off Maule, Chile struck the islands causing at least 8 deaths. Eleven people were reported as missing. Most of the town of San Juan Bautista on Robinson Crusoe Island was destroyed.

Government
As a commune, the Juan Fernández Islands are a third-level administrative division of Chile governed by a municipal council, headed by a mayor who is directly elected every four years. The current mayor for the term 2021–2024 is Pablo Andrés Manríquez Angulo.

Within the electoral divisions of Chile, the commune was represented in the Chamber of Deputies by Joaquín Godoy (RN) and Aldo Cornejo (PDC) as part of the 13th electoral district, together with Valparaíso and Easter Island. It was represented in the Senate by Francisco Chahuán Chahuán (RN) and Ricardo Lagos Weber (PPD) as part of the 6th senatorial constituency (Valparaíso-Coast).

Travel
The islands are served by Robinson Crusoe Airfield, located on Robinson Crusoe Island.

See also
Endemic fauna of the Juan Fernández Islands
Endemic flora of the Juan Fernández Islands
Flora of the Juan Fernández Islands

References

External links

 Commune Juan Fernández official government website (in Spanish)
 "Images of the Juan Fernández Islands" by W. Schipper in Travel Images
 "Map of Chili" by S. Augustus Mitchell (1860) from the World Digital Library
 "Menaces et perspectives pour la préservation de la biodiversité de l'Archipel Juan Fernández (Chili)"  by J. Vanhulst (2009) on preserving the islands' biodiversity (in French)

 
Archipelagoes of Chile
Archipelagoes of the Pacific Ocean
Communes of Chile
Ecoregions of Chile
Populated places in Valparaíso Province
Islands of Valparaíso Region
1895 establishments in Chile
Important Bird Areas of the Juan Fernández Islands
Seabird colonies
Island restoration
Temperate South America